Thomas Andrew Perry (born 22 February 1993) is a British speedway and grasstrack rider.

Career
Born in Albrighton, Shropshire in 1993, Tom Perry began grasstrack racing at the age of six and took up speedway at the age of ten. His grasstrack successes included winning the British 125cc Youth Championship in 2006, placing in the top three in both the 250cc and 350cc championships in 2009, a fourth place in the British Under-21 Championship and becoming the youngest rider ever to compete in the British Masters Championship when aged 16, finishing in fifth place.

In 2010 he joined National League speedway team Dudley Heathens, and continued to haves success in grasstrack, winning the British Under-21 Championship. After a successful first season is speedway, at the end of which he was voted 'rider of the year' by Heathens fans, he re-signed for the team in 2011, winning the National Shield with Heathens later that year. At the end of the season he was awarded a Darren and Sharon Boocock Speedway Scholarship which saw him travel to Australia to gain experience racing in Queensland.

In 2012 he continued with Heathens and also rode in the Premier League for Somerset Rebels, riding in 36 matches for the club. He finished as runner-up in the British Under-21 Speedway Championship that year.

In 2013 he was retained by Somerset in the Premier League, also riding for Isle of Wight Islanders in the National League. He represented Great Britain in the Under-21 Speedway World Cup semi-final, and finished fifth in the British Under-21 Speedway Championship.

In December 2013 he was picked in the reserve draft to ride for Leicester Lions in the Elite League in 2014.   Tom Perry is the Current 350cc British Grasstrack Champion, 2015.

He rode for the Belle Vue Colts during the 2018 National League speedway season.

References

1993 births
Living people
English motorcycle racers
British speedway riders
Belle Vue Colts riders
Cradley Heathens riders
Somerset Rebels riders
Isle of Wight Islanders riders
Leicester Lions riders